The Few were the airmen of the Royal Air Force (RAF) and the aviators of the Fleet Air Arm, Royal Navy (RN) who fought the Battle of Britain in the Second World War. The term comes from Winston Churchill's phrase "Never, in the field of human conflict, was so much owed by so many to so few." It also alludes to Shakespeare's famous speech in his play, Henry V: "We few, we happy few, we band of brothers..."

Aircrew

Nearly 3,000 men were awarded the "Battle of Britain" clasp. As six of the seven longest surviving veterans of the battle (Squadron Leader John Hart, Flight Lieutenant Archie McInnes, Flight Lieutenant Maurice Mounsdon, Air Vice-Marshal John Thornett Lawrence, Wing Commander Paul Farnes and Flight Lieutenant William Clark) died between June 2019 and May 2020 as of 8 May 2020, only one survivor of The Few is still living (Flying Officer John Hemingway).

By one tally, British RAF aircrew numbered 2,353 (80%) of the total of 2,927 flyers involved, with 407 Britons killed from a total of 510 losses. The remainder were not British, many coming from parts of the British Empire (particularly New Zealand, Canada, Australia, and South Africa), as well as exiles from many conquered European nations, particularly from Poland and Czechoslovakia. Other countries supplying smaller numbers included Belgium, France, Ireland (serving in the RAF as Ireland was officially neutral, but heavily biased towards the allies), Southern Rhodesia and the United States.

Legacy

Winston Churchill summed up the effect of the battle and the contribution of RAF Fighter Command, RAF Bomber Command, RAF Coastal Command and the Fleet Air Arm with the words, "Never in the field of human conflict was so much owed by so many to so few". Pilots who fought in the battle have been known as The Few ever since; at times being specially commemorated on 15 September, "Battle of Britain Day". On this day in 1940, the Luftwaffe embarked on their largest bombing attack yet, forcing the engagement of the entirety of the RAF in defence of London and the South East, which resulted in a decisive British victory that proved to mark a turning point in Britain's favour.

As of 2022, there is only one surviving member of the group still alive, John Hemingway.
The Horrible Histories song called “The Few” commemorates these airmen and women, including Sir Douglas Bader.

Memorials

The aircrew are remembered on the Battle of Britain Memorial, Capel-le-Ferne, Kent, and their names are listed on the Battle of Britain Monument in London.  The Battle of Britain Roll of Honour is held in Westminster Abbey in the RAF Chapel, and is paraded annually during the Service of Thanksgiving and re-dedication on Battle of Britain Sunday.

There is a preserved Hawker Hurricane fighter aircraft known as "The Last of The Many"—a reference to the 1942 film The First of the Few starring Leslie Howard as R.J. Mitchell, designer of the Spitfire—which flies as part of the Battle of Britain Memorial Flight, along with a Supermarine Spitfire that flew in the Battle (one of five Spitfires in the Memorial Flight). As the Hurricane was the last production model of that type, it did not itself fly in the Battle.

In 2022 a sculpture, the Spirit of the Few Monument, was unveiled at the Kent Battle of Britain Museum.

Statistics
The Battle of Britain was considered officially by the RAF to have been fought between 10 July and 31 October 1940.
 RAF pilots claimed to have shot down about 2,600 German aircraft, but figures compiled later suggest that Luftwaffe losses were more likely nearer 2,300.
 Of 2,332 Allied pilots who flew fighters in the Battle, 38.90 per cent could claim some success in terms of enemy aircraft shot down.
 The number of pilots claiming more than one victory amounted to no more than 15 per cent of the total RAF pilots involved.
 To be proclaimed an "ace" a pilot had to have five confirmed victories. During the Battle of Britain just 188 RAF pilots achieved that distinction – eight per cent of the total involved. A further 237 of those RAF pilots claiming successes during the Battle became "aces" later in the war.
 There were four pilots who were "ace in a day" in the Battle of Britain: Archie McKellar (British), Antoni Głowacki (Polish), Ronald Fairfax Hamlyn (British) and Brian Carbury (New Zealander).

Leading aces
The leading aces of the Battle of Britain (between 10 July and 31 October 1940) were:

Other notable Battle of Britain pilots

 Willie McKnight, 17 +  kills by 18 September 1940, 6 +  kills during the Battle
 David Moore Crook
 Alan Deere
 Harbourne Stephen
 Paddy Finucane
 Toni Glowacki, (Ace in a Day)
 A.G. "Sailor" Malan 
 Albert Gerald Lewis
 Stanisław Skalski
 John Hemingway, last surviving pilot of the Battle of Britain

In popular culture
The Few, a novel by Alex Kershaw, tells the stories of the men who flew in the Battle of Britain. , a Hollywood film similarly named The Few was in preparation for release in 2008, based on the story of real-life U.S. pilot Billy Fiske, who ignored his country's neutrality rules and volunteered for the RAF.  A Variety magazine outline of the film's historical content was said in The Independent to have been described by Bill Bond, who conceived the Battle of Britain Monument in London, as "Totally wrong. The whole bloody lot."

References

Notes

Bibliography

 Bickers, Richard Townshend. The Battle of Britain. New York: Salamander, 1990. .
 Wood, Derek and Derek Dempster. The Narrow Margin. Washington: Smithsonian Institution, reprint 1990. .

Further reading
 McGlashan, Kenneth B. with Zupp, Owen P. Down to Earth: A Fighter Pilot Recounts His Experiences of Dunkirk, the Battle of Britain, Dieppe, D-Day and Beyond. London: Grub Street Publishing, 2007. .

External links

 Battle of Britain Memorial website

 
 
Battle of Britain
Military history of the United Kingdom during World War II